34th BSFC Awards
December 8, 2013

Best Film: 
12 Years a Slave

The 34th Boston Society of Film Critics Awards, honoring the best in filmmaking in 2013, were given on December 8, 2013.

Winners

Best Film:
12 Years a Slave
Runner-up: The Wolf of Wall Street
Best Actor:
Chiwetel Ejiofor – 12 Years a Slave
Runner-up: Leonardo DiCaprio – The Wolf of Wall Street
Best Actress:
Cate Blanchett – Blue Jasmine
Runner-up: Brie Larson – Short Term 12
Best Supporting Actor:
James Gandolfini – Enough Said
Runners-up: Barkhad Abdi – Captain Phillips and Jared Leto – Dallas Buyers Club
Best Supporting Actress:
June Squibb – Nebraska
Runner-up: Lupita Nyong'o – 12 Years a Slave
Best Director:
Steve McQueen – 12 Years a Slave
Runner-up: Martin Scorsese – The Wolf of Wall Street
Best Screenplay:
Nicole Holofcener – Enough Said
Runner-up: Terence Winter – The Wolf of Wall Street
Best Cinematography:
Emmanuel Lubezki – Gravity
Runner-up: Philippe Le Sourd – The Grandmaster
Best Foreign Language Film:
Wadjda
Runner-up: Blue Is the Warmest Colour
Best Documentary:
The Act of Killing
Runner-up: Blackfish
Best Animated Film:
The Wind Rises
Runner-up: Frozen
Best Editing:
Daniel P. Hanley and Mike Hill – Rush
Runner-up: Thelma Schoonmaker – The Wolf of Wall Street
Best New Filmmaker:
Ryan Coogler – Fruitvale Station
Runner-up: Joshua Oppenheimer – The Act of Killing
Best Ensemble Cast:
Nebraska
Runner-up: The Wolf of Wall Street
Best Use of Music in a Film:
Inside Llewyn Davis
Runner-up: Nebraska

External links
 2013 Winners

References

2013
2013 film awards
2013 awards in the United States
2013 in Boston
December 2013 events in the United States